The Life Pursuit is the seventh studio album by Scottish indie pop band Belle & Sebastian. It was released in Europe on 6 February 2006 by Rough Trade Records and in North America on 7 February 2006 by Matador Records.

The models on the album cover are Alex Klobouk, Natasha Noramly, and Marisa Privitera.

Release and reception

The album earned the band its most successful chart performance yet, reaching #8 in the UK Album Chart and #65 on the Billboard 200 in the United States, selling 20,485 units in the first week. The Life Pursuit has been certified Silver in the UK. Lead single "Funny Little Frog" reached the top 20 of the UK Single Charts in January 2006, becoming the band's highest charting to date. "The Blues Are Still Blue" was released as the second single in April of that same year managing to peak inside the top 40. "White Collar Boy" was released as the last single in June peaking inside the top 50 of the same chart. Furthermore, "We Are the Sleepyheads" was used in MTV2 adverts. In 2009, Pitchfork named the album the 86th greatest of the 2000s.

The Life Pursuit has sold 112,000 units in US.

Track listing

Charts

References

Belle and Sebastian albums
2006 albums
Albums produced by Tony Hoffer